Giorgio Giudici (born 29 May 1945) is a Swiss architect and politician. He was mayor of Lugano from 1984 to 2013. His political party is the Partito liberale radicale svizzero (PLR).

References

Mayors of places in Switzerland
Living people
People from Lugano
1945 births